Manor Park railway station is on the Great Eastern Main Line serving Manor Park in the London Borough of Newham, east London. Its three-letter station code is MNP and it is in Travelcard Zone 3/4.

Manor Park is a short walk from Woodgrange Park on the Gospel Oak to Barking line, and an out-of-station interchange is available one stop to the west, at Forest Gate, for Wanstead Park.

History
The station was opened in 1873 by the Great Eastern Railway. 

In 2015, services run by Greater Anglia were intermediately rebranded to TfL Rail, as part of the development of the Elizabeth Line. Significant upgrades were made to the station, including the installation of 3 lifts, a new bridge, staircases, and signage.

Services
Train services call at Manor Park as part of the  – Paddington stopping service, operated as part of the Elizabeth line. From May 2023 the Elizabeth line service will be extended beyond Paddington to Heathrow Terminal 5.

The typical off-peak service is eight trains per hour in each direction between Paddington and Shenfield (on Sundays four of the eight trains terminate instead at Gidea Park).

In normal operation all services use platforms 1 and 2. Platforms 3 and 4, on the main line, are generally only operational during engineering works that affect the electric line. An additional short, unnumbered platform face is present to the south of platform 1 but is not in operation; the track behind it is used as a passing loop for freight traffic.

Future development
New  trains began entering service in 2017.

Due to the narrow platforms and the layout of the station, fitting lifts for disabled access is difficult, requiring the walkways to be rebuilt and closing parts of the station for several months. The station will receive new ticket machines and gates, an accessible toilet and new retail space.

Connections
London Buses routes 101, 304, 474 and W19 serve the station.

References

External links

 Excel file displaying National Rail station usage information for 2005/06

Railway stations in the London Borough of Newham
Former Great Eastern Railway stations
Railway stations in Great Britain opened in 1873
Railway stations served by the Elizabeth line
Railway station